The women's team tennis competition was held at the 2014 Asian Games. China were the defending champions.

Each tie is the best of three rubbers, two singles and one doubles match.

Schedule
All times are Korea Standard Time (UTC+09:00)

Results

1st round

Quarterfinals

Semifinals

Final

Non-participating athletes

References
Draw

External links
Official website

Tennis at the 2014 Asian Games